Lin Qisheng (Chinese: 林启升; born July 7, 1971) is a Chinese male weightlifter who won a silver medal at the 1992 Summer Olympics in the Men's 52 kg weightclass.

References

1971 births
Living people
Chinese male weightlifters
Olympic weightlifters of China
Weightlifters at the 1992 Summer Olympics
Olympic silver medalists for China
Olympic medalists in weightlifting
Medalists at the 1992 Summer Olympics
20th-century Chinese people